Europe World Championships are world sailing championships in the Europe class that have been held every year since 1966 (Open event). Since 1978 the event is split into an women and men event held (mostly) in conjunction. The event is, organized by the International Europe Class Union and recognized by the International Sailing Federation.

Europe was an Olympic Class from 1992 till 2004.

Editions

Medalists

Open

Men

Women

References

See also
 ISAF Sailing World Championships

External links
 Europe World Championships from site of the World Sailing
 Sailing World Championships – Men Europe from site Sports123.com (by Internet Archive)
 Sailing World Championships – Women Europe from site Sports123.com (by Internet Archive)

 
Recurring sporting events established in 1966